Dickson! is a collection of science fiction stories by American writer Gordon R. Dickson.  It was first published by NESFA Press in 1984 and was issued in honor of Dickson's appearance as guest of honor at the 42nd World Science Fiction Convention.  Most of the stories originally appeared in the magazines SFWA Bulletin, Astounding, Analog Science Fiction and Fact, Ellery Queen's Mystery Magazine and Science Fiction Stories.  The book contains introduction to each story by Sandra Miesel.

Contents

 Introduction, by Poul Anderson
 "Childe Cycle: Status 1984"
 "The Law-Twister Shorty"
 "Steel Brother"
 "The Hard Way"
 "Out of the Darkness"
 "Perfectly Adjusted"

References

1984 short story collections
Short story collections by Gordon R. Dickson
Books with cover art by Frank Kelly Freas
NESFA Press books